The 1996 United States Senate election in Colorado was held on November 5, 1996. Incumbent Republican U.S. Senator Hank Brown decided to retire instead of seeking a second term. Republican Wayne Allard won the open seat.

Republican primary

Candidates
 Wayne Allard, U.S. Representative from Fort Collins
 Gale Norton, Attorney General of Colorado

Results

Democratic primary

Candidates
 Tom Strickland, attorney
 Gene Nichol, dean of the University of Colorado Law School

Results

General election

Candidates
 Wayne Allard, U.S. Representative from Fort Collins (Republican)
 Randy MacKenzie (Natural Law)
 Tom Strickland, attorney (Democratic)

Results

See also 
 1996 United States Senate elections

References 

1996 Colorado elections
Colorado
1996